Sinon Monastery is a Buddhist monastery in Sikkim, northeastern India.Sinon Monastery is located in West Sikkim District. Sinon means 'the suppressor of intense fear'. The monastery was constructed in 1716 and is situated on a hilltop, 10 km from Tashiding. The monastery was built under the leadership of Pedi Wangmo, half-sister of Chogyal Chagdor Namgyal. The famous painting, Pedi Wangmo, can be found in the Sinon Monastery. Another famous Sikkimese artwork found in the monastery is a painting of Arhat Nagasena. The saint's peaceful face is expressed with a minimum of colours and line drawings. The painting displays strong influence of the Ajanta cave paintings.
The nearest airport is Civil Enclave Bagdogra

See also 
Buddhism
Gautama Buddha
History of Buddhism in India
Buddhist pilgrimage sites in India

References

External links 
 Buddhist pilgrimage sites in India
 Pilgrims Guide to Buddhist India: Buddhist Sites

Buddhist monasteries in Sikkim
Tibetan Buddhist monasteries and temples in India